The NCAA Men's Basketball All-American teams are teams made up of National Collegiate Athletic Association (NCAA) basketball players voted the best in the country by a variety of organizations.

History
All-America teams in college basketball were first named by both College Humor magazine and the Christy Walsh Syndicate in 1929. In 1932, the Converse shoe company began publishing All-America teams in their yearly "Converse Basketball Yearbook," and continued doing so until they ceased publication of the yearbook in 1983.  The Helms Athletic Foundation, created in 1936, retroactively named All-America teams for years 1905–35, and also continued naming teams until 1983.  The Associated Press began naming its team selections in 1948.

Consensus teams
While an increasing number of media outlets select All-America teams, the NCAA recognizes consensus All-America teams back to 1905.  These teams have drawn from two to six major media sources over the years, and are intended to reflect the opinions of most college basketball experts. Today the four outlets used to select consensus teams are the Associated Press, the National Association of Basketball Coaches, the United States Basketball Writers Association and Sporting News magazine. Since 1984, the NCAA has applied a standardized point system to those teams designated as "major" All-American teams to determine consensus teams. The point system consists of three points for first team, two points for second team and one point for third team. No honorable mention or fourth team or lower are used in the computation. The top five totals plus ties are first team and the next five plus ties are second team.

Teams used to determine consensus selections
Through the years, the following media outlets have been recognized and have been used to determine consensus teams. From 1905 to 1928, the Helms Athletic Foundation All-America teams are considered the "official" teams of those years by the NCAA.

Leaders by school
The top ten schools with the most consensus first-team All-Americans are listed below, ranked by total number of selections.  For a complete list, please see the NCAA records.

Academic All-Americans

In 1963, the first Academic All-American basketball team was named.  The first team, selected by the College Sports Information Directors of America (CoSIDA), consisted of: Rod Thorn of West Virginia, Ken Charlton of Colorado, Gerry Ward of Boston College, Art Becker of Arizona State and Ray Flynn of Providence.  CoSIDA has named Academic All-America teams continuously each year since. For a complete list of first-team Academic All-Americans, please see the official NCAA records.

Through 2020

Preseason All-Americans
In 1986, the Associated Press named the first preseason All-America team for the 1986–87 NCAA Division I men's basketball season.  Navy's David Robinson was the leading vote-getter that year.  He was joined on the team by Steve Alford of Indiana, Danny Manning of Kansas, Kenny Smith of North Carolina and Pervis Ellison of Louisville.  In 2011, Harrison Barnes of North Carolina became the first freshman voted a preseason All-American by the AP.

See also
 NCAA Women's Basketball All-Americans – NCAA Division I women's basketball equivalent
 AAU Men's Basketball All-Americans – similar honor presented to men's basketball players in the Amateur Athletic Union between 1920–21 and 1967–68

References

 
Awards established in 1905
History of college basketball in the United States
1929 establishments in the United States